The Upper Becker Creek Cone is a volcanic cone, located in the Upper Becker Creek area of Carbon Hill, Yukon, Canada. It was formed during the Tertiary eruptions of the Skukum Group.

See also
Volcanism of Northern Canada
List of volcanoes of Canada

Volcanoes of Yukon
Volcanic cones